Dottie is a studio album by American country music singer Dottie West, released in 1978.

This was West's second album as a solo artist under her new label, United Artists Records. The year the album was released, West also released an album with Kenny Rogers titled Every Time Two Fools Collide. The title track and the album hit No. 1 on the Billboard Country charts and revitalized West's career. However, her duet partner was still releasing a solo album of his own. West decided to do the same thing. Only one single was released from the album titled "Come See Me and Come Lonely", which reached the Country Top 20 at No. 17. The album also reached No. 47 on "Top Country Albums" chart. A cover version of the Larry Gatlin Top 5 hit "Broken Lady" can also be found on this album.

Track listing

Charts
Album – Billboard (North America)

Singles – Billboard (North America)

Dottie West albums
1978 albums
Albums arranged by Bill Justis
Albums produced by Larry Butler (producer)
United Artists Records albums